Matijevic Hill, named after American NASA engineer Jacob "Jake" Matijevic (1947 - 2012), is a hill located on "Cape York", itself on the western rim of Endeavour Crater lying within the Margaritifer Sinus quadrangle (MC-19) region of the planet Mars. It was discovered by the Opportunity rover, and named by NASA on September 28, 2012.  The "approximate" site coordinates are: .

The hill includes a rock outcrop called Kirkwood, where Opportunity found a concentration of small spherical features. It also includes an area where clay minerals have been detected from orbiter observations.

See also
 Composition of Mars
 Geography of Mars
 Jake Matijevic (rock)
 List of rocks on Mars
List of surface features of Mars imaged by Opportunity

References

External links

Official Mars Rovers site

Hills on Mars
Mars Exploration Rover mission
Margaritifer Sinus quadrangle